The list of ship commissionings in 1957 includes a chronological list of all ships decommissioned in 1957.


See also 

1957